German submarine U-879 was a Type IXC/40 U-boat built for Nazi Germany's Kriegsmarine during World War II.

Design
German Type IXC/40 submarines were slightly larger than the original Type IXCs. U-879 had a displacement of  when at the surface and  while submerged. She had two shafts and two  propellers.

U-879 was fitted with six  torpedo tubes (four fitted at the bow and two at the stern), 22 torpedoes, one  SK C/32 naval gun, 180 rounds, and a  Flak M42 as well as two twin  C/30 anti-aircraft guns. The boat had a complement of forty-eight.

Service history
U-879 was ordered on 2 April 1942 from DeSchiMAG AG Weser in Bremen under the yard number 1087. Her keel was laid down on 26 June 1943 and the U-boat was launched the following year on 11 January 1944. She was commissioned into service under the command of Kapitänleutnant Erwin Manchen (Crew 36) in 4th U-boat Flotilla.

U-879 was transferred to 33rd U-boat Flotilla after completing training and working up for deployment. She left her base in Horten Naval Base on 9 February 1945 for operations off the US east coast. Since another U-boat,  was operating at the same time in the vicinity, it is not clear, which ships were attacked U-879 or the other U-boat, which is missing. The US tanker Atlantic States was probably hit and damaged on 5 April 1945, while the Belgian steamer Belgian Airman and the US tanker Swiftscout may have been sunk by U-879 on 14 and 18 April respectively. The Norwegian tanker Katy might have been hit and damaged on 23 April.

Late on 29 April, a U-boat was picked up by escorts of convoy KN 382.  tried to ram her but missed. In the early hours of 30 April, a strong explosion was heard and the contact disappeared. Only in 1968 a wreck was discovered, confirming the sinking of a U-boat. It is assumed that the U-boat in question was U-879, but there are indicators that it might have been U-857 instead.

Summary of raiding history

References

Bibliography

External links

World War II submarines of Germany
German Type IX submarines
1944 ships
U-boats commissioned in 1944
U-boats sunk in 1945
U-boats sunk by depth charges
U-boats sunk by US warships
Ships built in Bremen (state)
Ships lost with all hands
Maritime incidents in April 1945